Henry Louis Scott (November 16, 1889 – June 1960) was an American long-distance runner who competed in the 1912 Summer Olympics. He was part of the American team which won the gold medal in the 3000 m team event. He also competed in the final of the 5000 m, but his place is unknown. In the 10000 m competition he did not finish the final, due to a strong heat. At the same Olympics he finished 24th in the individual cross country race.

References

External links
 

1889 births
1960 deaths
American male long-distance runners
Athletes (track and field) at the 1912 Summer Olympics
Olympic gold medalists for the United States in track and field
Sportspeople from Paterson, New Jersey
Medalists at the 1912 Summer Olympics
Olympic cross country runners